Diwangi Ne Had Kar Di is a 2010 Hindi romance film/thriller film directed by Jiten Purohit and produced by himself under the banner of Asheema Creations. The film was released on 19 November 2010.

Cast
 Aditya Raj Kapoor
 Zeenal Kamdar
 Deep
 Ashhmita
 Jeet Upendra
 Baby Paridhi

Soundtrack

The music of Diwangi Ne Had Kar Di was composed by Sandesh Shandilya.

Track listing

References

External links
 https://web.archive.org/web/20101122032837/http://in.movies.yahoo.com/movies/Diwangi-Ne-Had-Kar-Di/details-10510.html

2010 films
2010s Hindi-language films